Biagio Pupini was an Italian painter of the Renaissance period, active mainly in his native city of Bologna.  He was known to be active mainly during 1530–1540. He was a disciple of Francesco Francia. He completed paintings for the church of San Giuliano, Basilica of San Giacomo Maggiore, and the church of Santa Maria della Baroncella.

Works
Madonna and Saint Ursula, Giacomo Maggiore church, Bologna
Marriage of the Virgin, auctioned by Christie's in 2003 in Paris
Virgin and Child, Dorotheum, Vienna
Mystic Marriage of Saint Catherine, auctioned at Christie's in 2005 in New York
Mystic Marriage of Saint Catherine, Musée Jeanne d'Aboville of La Fère
Virgin and Child with Saints, auctioned at Christie's in 1998 in London
Apparition of the Virgin, San Petronio (Saint Petronius) church, Bologna
Frescoes at San Salvatore church, Bologna, worked with Bagnacavallo
Lost frescoes from 1511 at the main chapel at Santa Maria delle Grazie church, Faenza, also worked with Bagnacavallo.
Diogenes and Alexander

References

External links

16th-century Italian painters
Italian male painters
Painters from Bologna
Italian Mannerist painters
Year of death unknown
Year of birth unknown